CPC Attack! was a short-lived magazine dedicated to Amstrad CPC gaming. The magazine was a successor to Amstrad Computer User magazine. It was characterised by a strong comic-like graphical style featuring a recurring mascot - a Tank Girl-like character called Amy Strad. Funnily enough this same character featured in C+VG magazine under the name Sadie. Originally, Amstrad Computer User had been a much more serious magazine than its main rival Amstrad Action. The radical redesign to CPC Attack! was probably an attempt to appeal to Amstrad Action readers.

The magazine only ran for six issues between June and November 1992. This may have been because it did not have a cover-mounted tape (like Amstrad Action) and was devoted entirely to gaming leaving little room for other computer uses, but was probably also due to the waning popularity of the Amstrad 8-bit computer systems. The magazine did give away a number of free gifts with its early issues, although their relevance to readers was questionable. Issue 1 came with a pair of 3D glasses and a poster.

The magazine also drew criticism for running features that promoted the new wave of 16-bit consoles such as the Mega Drive and SNES. CPC Attack! also openly dismissed its rival Amstrad Action within its pages on several occasions, which many readers thought was unnecessary and immature.

External links
 CPC Attack! archived at Internet Archive

Amstrad CPC
Amstrad magazines
Video game magazines published in the United Kingdom
Defunct computer magazines published in the United Kingdom
Magazines established in 1992
Magazines disestablished in 1992
Magazines published in London